Trần Nguyên Mạnh (born 20 December 1991) is a Vietnamese professional footballer who plays as a goalkeeper for V.League 1 club Nam Định and the Vietnam national team.

International career
In the second leg of the semifinals of the 2016 AFF Championship against Indonesia Nguyên Mạnh caused controversy when he kicked out at an Indonesian player who had bundled him over during a corner kick. Referee Fu Ming showed Nguyên Mạnh a straight red card and Vietnam were forced to put Quế Ngọc Hải in goal as they had already made all three substitutions. A month later Nguyên Mạnh was fined US$1,000 by the AFC and would be barred from playing in any of the 2019 AFC qualifying matches.

Personal life
In March 2016, Nguyên Mạnh married Phương Chi in a private ceremony. The two had been in a relationship for six years up to that point, before Nguyên Mạnh had even started playing for Sông Lam Nghệ An.

Careeer statistics

International

Honours
Sông Lam Nghệ An
V.League 1: 2011
Vietnamese National Cup: 2017
Viettel
V.League 1: 2020
Vietnam 
AYA Bank Cup: 2016
VFF Cup: 2022
AFF Championship runners-up: 2022

References

External links
 

1991 births
Living people
Vietnamese footballers
Vietnam international footballers
Association football goalkeepers
V.League 1 players
Song Lam Nghe An FC players